Lesley Anderson-Herweck (born 6 April 1961) is a Canadian rowing cox. She competed in the women's eight event at the 1984 Summer Olympics.

References

External links
 

1961 births
Living people
Canadian female rowers
Olympic rowers of Canada
Rowers at the 1984 Summer Olympics
Sportspeople from North Bay, Ontario
Coxswains (rowing)